National Road 38 (abbreviated as EO38) is a single carriageway road in western and central Greece. It connects Thermo with Lamia, via Agrinio and Karpenisi. It passes through the regional units Aetolia-Acarnania, Evrytania and Phthiotis. The section between Agrinio and Lamia coincides with the European route E952.

Route
The western end of the National Road is in the small town Thermo, in Aetolia-Acarnania. It first runs west along the northern shore of Lake Trichonida. It turns north at Agrinio, and continues through the sparsely populated mountains of northeastern Aetolia-Acarnania. The highway crosses the Kremasta reservoir by the Episkopi bridge. It continues east through the mountainous Agrafa area, part of the Pindus mountains. It passes through Karpenisi, the capital town of Evrytania. East of Karpenisi, it passes through a tunnel under the Tymfristos mountain and enters the Spercheios valley. The National Road 38 passes through the following places:

Thermo 
Paravola
Agrinio
Agios Vlasios
Episkopi
Fragkista
Kalesmeno
Karpenisi
Tymfristos
Agios Georgios Tymfristou
Makrakomi
Leianokladi
Lamia

38
Roads in Western Greece
Roads in Central Greece